WarGames: Defcon 1 (known simply as WarGames on PC) is a video game for the PlayStation and Microsoft Windows developed by Interactive Studios and co-published by MGM Interactive and Electronic Arts (in North America, MGM Interactive solely published the game). Although both versions possess the same missions and content, the PlayStation version is a tactical vehicle-shooting game while the PC version is a real-time strategy game (similar to Jeff Wayne's The War of the Worlds). The game is loosely based on the movie WarGames; the story was scripted by John Badham, director of the original film.

PlayStation version
The player plays as NORAD or WOPR. The game takes place 20 years after the film: WOPR attempts to exterminate humanity and NORAD tries to stop it. During a mission the player takes control of a vehicle and can change the controls of any vehicle the team has—for example, while NORAD has heavily armored and armed tanks and aircraft, WOPR possesses exotically futuristic mechs and hovercraft. Vehicles can recharge ammo by obtaining powers. The player can command their team to send resupply on ammos, repair damage units, attack, or follow the player's main vehicle.

Multiplayer
WarGames: Defcon 1 features 2-player split screen VS. or Co-op. The Co-op allows the players to play all single player levels with a partner. Unlike most multiplayer games, the screen is split diagonally.

PC version
Unlike the PlayStation version, the PC version is a real-time strategy game, in which the player can control different units at once. The missions are identical to the PlayStation version.

The electronic registration program included on the game CD contained the Marburg computer virus; playing the game would not cause the player's computer to be infected with the virus, but registering it electronically would.

Development
WarGames: Defcon 1 was one of the few strategy games of its time to not use a tile system, instead allowing troops to be place and moved freely across the landscape. Team leader John Whigham commented, "While this is of great benefit to the player and to the game in general, the programming nightmares it raises have given us more than one sleepless night over the last few months." The game was showcased at E3 1997

Reception

The PlayStation version received favourable reviews, while the PC version received average reviews, according to the review aggregation website GameRankings. Next Generation called the former version "a fun romp that is, unfortunately, a bit on the short side. A two-player combat option alleviates this problem somewhat. The bottom line? If you have a second player handy, get it. If not, rent it – it makes for a good three-day weekend of fun"; and called the latter "a fairly competent and well-crafted game. It just doesn't take the genre in any new direction and feels like little more than a me-too effort." Mark Kanarick of AllGame gave Defcon 1 two-and-a-half stars out of five, saying, "I like what MGM Interactive is trying to do in WarGames Defcon 1, but the game just seems to far out there for someone who is not a strategy/wargame enthusiast to grasp. I think it is enjoyable for those looking for a 'different' game, but there is nothing substantial here to warrant anything more than a rental."

Notes

References

External links

1998 video games
PlayStation (console) games
Video games based on films
Video games developed in the United Kingdom
Video games set in the Arctic
Video games set in Belgium
Video games set in Cambodia
Video games set in China
Video games set in the Czech Republic
Video games set in Egypt
Video games set in the Falkland Islands
Video games set in Florida
Video games set in Guernsey
Video games set in Hong Kong
Video games set in Indonesia
Video games set in Libya
Video games set in Louisiana
Video games set in Mexico
Video games set in Moscow
Video games set in Nebraska
Video games set in New England
Video games set in New York City
Video games set in North Carolina
Video games set in Oceania
Video games set in the Republic of the Congo
Video games set in Russia
Video games set in Saint Vincent and the Grenadines
Video games set in Saudi Arabia
Video games set in South Africa
Video games set in Switzerland
Video games set in Tokyo
Video games set in Washington, D.C.
Windows games
MGM Interactive games
Split-screen multiplayer games
Video games about nuclear war and weapons
Video games about video games
Video games with alternative versions
Blitz Games Studios games
Multiplayer and single-player video games